Lentelied  is a 1936 Dutch film directed by Simon Koster.

Cast
Jan Teulings... 	Frans Vermeer
Lau Ezerman	... 	Van Buren
Ank van der Moer	... 	Charlotte van Buren
Dick Swidde	... 	Bobby Bevering
Jules Verstraete	... 	Willems
Joke Bosch	... 	Marietje
Julia Cuypers	... 	Waardin van Hotel 'De Zon'
John Schilthuizen	... 	Jef
Nell Knoop	... 	Juffrouw van der Linden
Cor Hermus	... 	Matthijsen

External links 
 

1936 films
Dutch black-and-white films
Dutch romance films
1930s romance films
1930s Dutch-language films